The 10th Bodil Awards was held in 1957 in Copenhagen, Denmark, honouring the best in Danish and foreign film of 1956.

Be Dear to Me directed by Annelise Hovmand, and actor Peter Malberg for his role in the same film, each received an award.

 got a Bodil Award for Best Documentary for Ellehammerfilmen, and the neighbouring Sweden won Best European Film with Ingmar Bergman's Smiles of a Summer Night.

For the first time, the critics had not been able to choose an American film – U.S. producers had boycotted the Danish market.

Honorees

Best Danish Film 
 Be Dear to Me directed by Annelise Hovmand

Best Actor in a Leading Role 
 Peter Malberg in Be Dear to Me

Best Actress in a Leading Role 
 Birgit Sadolin in

Best Actor in a Supporting Role 
 Not awarded

Best Actress in a Supporting Role 
 Not awarded

Best European Film 
 Smiles of a Summer Night directed by Ingmar Bergman

Best American Film 
 Not awarded

Best Documentary 
 Ellehammerfilmen directed by

References

Further reading

External links 
 10th Bodil Awards at the official Bodil Awards website

Bodil Awards ceremonies
1957 film awards
1957 in Denmark
1950s in Copenhagen